Oumou Toure may refer to:

Oumou Touré (born 1988), Senegalese basketball player
Oumou Toure (footballer) (born 1994), Malian footballer